This is a list of various productions from Blumhouse Productions, which includes feature films, television projects, shorts, documentaries, books, comics and podcasts.

Films

2000s

2010s

2020s

Upcoming films

Undated films

Television

Released television projects

Upcoming television projects

Short films

Documentaries

Books

Comics

Podcasts

See also
 Jason Blum
 Monkeypaw Productions
 Platinum Dunes
 Blinding Edge Pictures
 Atomic Monster Productions
 Divide/Conquer
 Neon

References

External links
 

American films by studio
Lists of films by studio
Lists of television series